Atoll K is a 1951 Franco-Italian co-production film—also known as Robinson Crusoeland in the United Kingdom and Utopia in the United States – which starred the comedy duo Laurel and Hardy in their final screen appearance. The film co-stars French singer/actress Suzy Delair and was directed by Léo Joannon, with uncredited co-direction by blacklisted U.S. director John Berry.

Plot

Stan learns that he is to receive an inheritance left by a wealthy uncle. Unfortunately, most of the inheritance is consumed by taxes and legal fees, and he is left with only a rickety but fully provisioned yacht and a private island in the Pacific Ocean. Stan and Ollie leave for the island, accompanied by stateless refugee Antoine (Max Elloy) and stowaway Giovanni Copini, a malcontent Italian bricklayer (Adriano Rimoldi).

On the voyage, the friendly Antoine acts as chef, but the food mysteriously disappears from Stan's plate because stowaway Giovanni is taking it. This leads Stan to blame Ollie and an argument ensues. The engine then fails (it's revealed in the beginning that the problem is merely a fuel leak due to the cap's coming loose, but the boys don't know this yet), so Ollie removes parts in an attempt to fix it. He hands them to Stan, who puts them on the deck where they slide overboard. Ollie then realizes that his efforts were in vain when he notices that the fuel gauge reads empty. Having lost the engine, they hoist the sail, revealing Giovanni hiding in it.

They encounter a storm and Stan battles with an inflating liferaft in the cabin while Ollie is at the helm. They are shipwrecked on a newly emerged desert island, which they dub "Crusoeland" after the book Robinson Crusoe that is on their yacht. They are soon joined by Chérie Lamour, a nightclub singer (Suzy Delair) who is fleeing her jealous fiancé Jack Frazer, a naval lieutenant (Luigi Tosi). In order to prevent the island from falling into the hands of an existing nation-state, it is established as a new republic, with Hardy as president and Laurel as "the people." They write a constitution declaring their atoll will have no laws, no taxes, and no immigration controls.

All goes well until the singer's fiancé arrives to confirm the island is rich with uranium deposits. People from all over the world flock to "Atoll K" as it has been named, but soon the situation turns chaotic when a revolt seeks to overthrow and execute the island's original inhabitants. Before the execution, another storm strikes and floods the island. Laurel and Hardy are rescued and arrive at the island Laurel inherited, only to have their land and supplies confiscated for failure to pay taxes. The film ends with Oliver ranting to Stan "Well, here's another nice mess you've gotten me into!" and Stan whimpering.

Cast

Production
In the late 1940s, Laurel and Hardy were without film employment. Earlier in the decade, they ended their long association with producer Hal Roach and signed to make a series of films at both 20th Century Fox and Metro-Goldwyn-Mayer. In post-World War II Europe, Laurel and Hardy were enjoying a new popularity with audiences that had been unable to see their movies during wartime. As a result of this, the pair received an offer from a French-Italian cinematic consortium to star in a film to be produced in France for $1.5 million, a large budget for the era.

The production of Atoll K was plagued with many problems that caused the making of the film to run nine months beyond its projected schedule of twelve weeks. Ida Laurel, Stan Laurel's widow, told biographer John McCabe, "I'm hardly likely to forget the date we left for France and the date we returned – April 1, 1950, and April 1, 1951. But there was no April Fooling about that terrible year. That bloody picture was supposed to take twelve weeks to make, and it took twelve months."

From the beginning, there were disagreements on the film's screenplay. Laurel was unhappy with the storyline envisioned by French director Léo Joannon and insisted on bringing Alfred Goulding and Monty Collins to aid in writing the screenplay (Alf Goulding received no on-screen credit and Monty Collins was credited with "gags"). There were also considerable problems with communications, since neither Laurel nor Hardy spoke any French and director Joannon spoke very little English.

During the production, the two comedy stars were battling serious health issues. Laurel's pre-existing diabetes was aggravated and he developed colitis, dysentery and a prostate ulcer while on the French locations for the film. He eventually required hospitalization, and his widow would later fault the quality of the French medical care, claiming that at one point, she had to substitute for an absent nurse by changing her husband's bandages. Laurel's weight dropped to 114 pounds, and for most of the production he was able to work for only 20 to 30 minutes at a time.

While in France, Hardy saw his already hefty frame expand to 330 pounds and he required medical care for an irregular heartbeat and a severe case of the flu. Adding to the medical problems was Italian actor Adriano Rimoldi, who played the stowaway, when he fell from a docked yacht and required a month to recuperate away from the production.

When they were able to work, Laurel and Hardy saw their relationship with Joannon deteriorate rapidly. Ida Laurel would later claim Joannon was an incompetent director who spent three days filming a lake because, as she said, "it was the most photogenic lake he'd ever seen." In the middle of the production, US film director John Berry was quietly brought in to work with the team. Berry's US career had been derailed by the Hollywood blacklist and he sought to start over in France. However, his participation was kept secret out of the fear that the film would not get a US theatrical release if it became known that a blacklisted director was at its helm. Berry's contribution was not publicly acknowledged until 1967, when film historian William K. Everson cited the uncredited director's input in his book The Films of Laurel and Hardy. While Berry never publicly acknowledged his work on Atoll K, the film's leading lady Suzy Delair confirmed his role during an interview with historian Norbert Aping.

Theatrical release
The theatrical release of Atoll K was confusing and erratic. There was never one definitive version of the film but, rather, four different edits available: the 93-minute French version called Atoll K, a 97-minute Italian version called Atollo K, an 82-minute English version called Robinson Crusoeland in the United Kingdom and Utopia in the United States, and a 98-minute English version again titled Atoll K viewed only at British premieres in September, 1951.

In the countries where the various versions played, critical reaction to the film was overwhelmingly poor. The French newspaper Journal du Dimanche complained: "What in hell lured Laurel and Hardy onto this atoll? Unfortunately, this adventure adds nothing to their fame." Italian critic Paolo Locori, writing for the magazine Hollywood, stated: "Stan and Ollie's presence is not enough to lift the movie from its mediocrity." The British Kinematograph Weekly stated the film was "bogged down in a welter of obvious slapstick." When Utopia ultimately played in Los Angeles in early 1955 as a double feature with Blackboard Jungle, the Los Angeles Times critic said: "The film gets off with some welcome chuckles but grows progressively worse."

Copyright status and availability
Over the years, the prints of three of the four versions have degraded. No U.S. copyright was filed for Utopia and the version lapsed into the public domain, resulting in duplicated prints of poor quality used for distribution. Until recently, the only known print of the original 98-minute English version was in private hands and this version has never been released on video. However, on January 1, 2012, the French/German TV station ARTE aired a restored 100-minute English version of the film, claiming an international television premiere. The restored copy is based on a copy rediscovered in 2010 in the United States. It was released to DVD by Fun Factory Films on January 3, 2013.

Truncated 85/88-minute prints available in Italy on VHS and DVD are all that remain of the Italian version. The original French Atoll K was released on VHS in 1996. On October 10, 2012, the French version of the film was released by Gaumont à la demande on DVD.

In 2018, a Blu-ray version of Atoll K was released in the UK (Region B only). The film has also been televised in the U.S. under the Utopia title by the Movies! network as part of its Saturday morning Laurel and Hardy Show series.

References
Notes

Bibliography

 Aping, Norbert. The Final Film of Laurel and Hardy: A Study of the Chaotic Making and Marketing of Atoll K. Jefferson, North Carolina: McFarland, 2008. .
 Bowers, Judith. Stan Laurel and Other Stars of the Panopticon: The Story of the Britannia Music Hall. Edinburgh: Birlinn Ltd, 2007. .
 Everson, William K. The Complete Films of Laurel and Hardy. New York: Citadel, 2000, (first edition 1967). .
 Louvish, Simon. Stan and Ollie: The Roots of Comedy. London: Faber & Faber, 2001. . 
 Marriot, A.J. Laurel & Hardy: The British Tours. Hitchen, Herts, UK: AJ Marriot, 1993. .
 McCabe, John. Babe: The Life of Oliver Hardy. London: Robson Books Ltd., 2004. .
 McCabe, John with Al Kilgore and Richard W. Bann. Laurel & Hardy. New York: Bonanza Books, 1983, first edition 1975, E.P. Dutton. .
 McGarry, Annie. Laurel & Hardy. London: Bison Group, 1992. .

External links 

 
 
 
 
  (As Utopia)

1951 films

French black-and-white films
Italian black-and-white films
Fictional islands
Films directed by John Berry
Films set in a fictional country
Films set in Oceania
Films set on uninhabited islands
Laurel and Hardy (film series)
Films set on fictional islands
English-language French films
English-language Italian films
French comedy films
1951 comedy films
1950s American films
1950s French films